Hirschberg (Ohlstadt) is a mountain of Bavaria, Germany.

Mountains of Bavaria
Bavarian Prealps
Mountains of the Alps